Umargam Road railway station is a medium railway station in Valsad district, Gujarat, India. It is owned and operated by Indian Railways and is in the Western Railway zone. Its station code is UBR. It serves Umargam and near by towns. The station consists of three platforms. It has shelter roofs on the platforms. It has Pay & Use toilets.

Major trains

Following trains halt at Umargam Road railway station in both directions:
 69153/54 Umargam Road–Valsad MEMU
 22929/30 Dahanu Road–Vadodara Superfast Express
 59023/24 Mumbai Central–Valsad Fast Passenger
 19015/16 Saurashtra Express
 22953/54 Gujarat Superfast Express
 22927/28 Lok Shakti Express

References 

Mumbai WR railway division
Railway stations in Valsad district